The Penn Quakers are the athletic teams of the University of Pennsylvania. The school sponsors 33 varsity sports. The school has won three NCAA national championships in men's fencing and one in women's fencing.

School colors

There are several legends relating how "The Red and Blue" came to be used by the University of Pennsylvania.  Whether they are fact or fiction remains unknown.

 Harvard and Yale.  In the early days of the university there was a race among the students of Harvard, Yale, and the University of Pennsylvania.  The Harvard team wore their famous crimson; Yale teams wore their traditional blue.  When the Penn participants were asked which colors would represent their team, they replied that they would be wearing the colors of the two teams they would soon beat.  The Penn athletes won the race, and Penn teams used those colors from then on.
 George Washington's Clothing.  It is rumored that George Washington visited the university during one of his terms as President of the United States.  He is supposed to have arrived wearing a blue jacket and breeches with a red waistcoat.  The next day, the students decked the university in these colors and donned red and blue themselves to honor the president.  Afterward, it was decided to use these colors by the university. 
 Penn's and Franklin's Coats of Arms.  When the university was creating a seal and coat of arms it decided to use elements from both Benjamin Franklin's and William Penn's coats-of-arms—Franklin had helped to found the university, and Penn had founded the Commonwealth of Pennsylvania.  Franklin's coat of arms contained the color red and Penn's featured a blue chevron.

As University Archivist Francis James Dallett pointed out in 1983: "Eighteenth-century American academic institutions simply did not have colors."  This leaves one inclined to relegate the above explanations to the realm of local myth.

A resolution adopted by the university trustees on May 17, 1910, states:
"The colors shall be red and blue,...The colors [of the University of Pennsylvania] shall conform to the present standards used by the United States Government in its flags."  Thus it is possible to determine when Penn adopted the colors red and blue, at least officially.

Men's varsity sports

Baseball

Mark DeRosa played varsity baseball for the Penn Quakers from 1994 to 1996.

Men's basketball

Men's crew

Crew at Penn dates back to at least 1854 with the founding of the University Barge Club. The university currently hosts both heavyweight and lightweight men's teams, which compete as part of the Eastern Sprints League.  Ellis Ward was Penn's first intercollegiate crew coach from 1879 through 1912. During course of Ward's coaching career at Penn his "... Red and Blue crews won 65 races, in about 150 starts." Importantly, Ward coached Penn's 8 oared boat to the finals of the Grand Challenge Cup (the oldest and most prized trophy) at the  Henley Royal Regatta (but in that final race was defeated by the champion Leander Club).

Penn Rowing has produced a long list of famous coaches and Olympians. Members of Penn crew team, rowers Sidney Jellinek, Eddie Mitchell, and coxswain, John G. Kennedy won the bronze medal for the United States at 1924 Olympics. Joseph William Burk (Penn Class of 1935), captain of Penn Crew team and winner of the Henley Diamond Sculls twice, was named recipient of the James E. Sullivan Award for nation's best amateur athlete. The outbreak of World War Two canceled the 1940 Olympics for which he was favored to win the Gold Medal. Other Olympic athletes and or coaches of such athletes include John B. Kelly Jr., Joe Burk, Rusty Callow, Harry Parker and Ted Nash. In 1955, the Penn men's heavyweight crew became one of only four American university crews to win the Grand Challenge Cup at the Henley Royal Regatta. The Penn teams presently row out of College Boat Club, No.11 Boathouse Row.

Men's fencing

Football

The football team has competed since 1876. It has won eighteen national championships when the school competed in what is now known as the FBS. Since the formation of the Ivy League in 1956, Penn has won 17 Ivy League Football Championships.(1959, 1982, 1983, 1984, 1985, 1986, 1988, 1993, 1994, 1998, 2000, 2002, 2003, 2009, 2010, 2012, 2015). Penn has been outright Ivy Football Champion 13 times and been undefeated 8 times. Eighteen former players have been inducted into the College Football Hall of Fame.

In addition to the varsity squad, the Penn Quakers are a charter member of the Collegiate Sprint Football League, having played the sport since 1934.

Men's lacrosse

Men's soccer

Before the NCAA began its tournament in 1959, the annual national champion was declared by the Intercollegiate Association Football League (IAFL) — from 1911 to 1926 — and then the Intercollegiate Soccer Football Association (ISFA), from 1927 to 1958. From 1911 to 1958, Penn won ten national championships.

Men's squash

The University of Pennsylvania features one of the fastest rising men's squash programs in the nation, reaching new heights in 2020 by finishing as national runners up. The feat marked the first such occasion in program history.

Men's swimming
The Penn men's swimming team was founded in 1894. They have won the Ivy League championships five times: in 1940; 1964–65; 1967–68; 1969–70; and 1970–71. Penn's swim team practices and competes at Sheerr Pool in the Pottruck fitness facility.

Wrestling
Penn Quaker Wrestling dates back to 1905, where the first intercollegiate wrestling championship was held in Weightman Hall Gym located on University of Penn campus. Princeton, Yale and Columbia joined Penn in founding the Eastern Intercollegiate Wrestling Association (EIWA), which the team currently competes in. Coached by Hall of Fame coach and Penn alumnus Roger Reina C'84. The Penn Quaker Wrestling team currently competes in the historic Palestra Arena.

Women's varsity sports

Women's basketball

Penn has won the Ivy League title in 2001, 2004, 2014, 2016, and 2017.

Women's crew

Women's fencing

Women's lacrosse

Championships

NCAA team championships

Penn has 4 NCAA team national championships.

Men's (3)
Fencing (3): 1953, 1969, 1981
Women's (1)
Fencing (1): 1986
See also:
Ivy League NCAA team championships
List of NCAA schools with the most NCAA Division I championships

See also
Olympic Boycott Games (1980) – held at the University of Pennsylvania
Penn Relays
"The Red and Blue"
Philadelphia Sports Hall of Fame
Sports in Philadelphia#Collegiate sports
National Collegiate Athletic Association#Football television controversy

References

External links
 

 
Philadelphia Big 5